Raphael Andrei Stănescu (born 27 June 1993) is a Romanian footballer who plays as a midfielder for Liga III side Minaur Baia Mare. In the past he played in the Liga I for Dinamo București and in the lower divisions for team such as Farul Constanța, Daco-Getica București, CSM Reșița or Dacia Unirea Brăila, among others.

Career 
Stănescu made his Dinamo first-team debut on 22 May 2010, coming off the bench in a match against SC Vaslui as a substitute for Andrei Cristea. His first goal for Dinamo came in a game against CS Mioveni, on 12 May 2012. In 2014, he ended his contract with Dinamo, because he didn't have too many chances to play for the Reds-and-Whites.

Honours
Minaur Baia Mare
Liga III: 2021–22

References

External links 
 
 

1993 births
Living people
People from Deggendorf (district)
Sportspeople from Lower Bavaria
German people of Romanian descent
Romanian footballers
Association football midfielders
Liga I players
Liga II players
Liga III players
I liga players
FC Dinamo București players
Flota Świnoujście players
ASC Oțelul Galați players
FCV Farul Constanța players
ASC Daco-Getica București players
CSM Reșița players
AFC Dacia Unirea Brăila players
CS Minaur Baia Mare (football) players
Romanian expatriate footballers
Romanian expatriate sportspeople in Poland
Expatriate footballers in Poland
Footballers from Bavaria